Kalgary is an unincorporated community in Crosby County, Texas, United States. According to the Handbook of Texas, the community had an estimated population of 70 in 2000.

Kalgary is part of the Lubbock Metropolitan Statistical Area.

Geography
It is located within the rolling plains along a drainage divide that separates the White River and the Salt Fork Brazos River, both tributaries of the Brazos River.

Climate
According to the Köppen climate classification system, Kalgary has a semiarid climate, BSk on climate maps.

History
The community was established around 1905, when E.P. Swenson started selling parcels of his  SMS Ranch. First known as Spur, the community became known as Watson, after early settler Richard Watson Self. A post office opened in 1911, but closed two years later. It reopened in 1925, and in 1927, the community's name was changed from Watson to Kalgary after Calgary, Alberta. By the early 1930s, Kalgary was home to about 10 residents. That figure rose to 100 in 1940. At that time, three stores and a gin were operating in the community. In 1949, the local school district - known as Self County Line – began consolidating with nearby Crosbyton. No more classes were held in Kalgary after an October 1952 fire destroyed the local school. During the latter half of the 20th century, the population was estimated to be around 140. That number had decreased to 70 by 2000.

Education
Public education in the community of Kalgary is provided by the Crosbyton Consolidated Independent School District.

See also
Canyon Valley, Texas
Duffy's Peak
Estacado, Texas
Mount Blanco
McDonald Creek

References

External links

Unincorporated communities in Crosby County, Texas
Unincorporated communities in Texas
Lubbock metropolitan area